{{Infobox film
| name           = Srinivasa Kalyanam
| image          = Srinivasa Kalyanam 2018 film poster.jpg
| caption        = Theatrical release poster
| writer         = Satish Vegesna
| producer       = Dil Raju
| director       = Satish Vegesna
| starring       = NithinRaashi KhannaNandita Swetha
| music          = Mickey J. Meyer
| cinematography = Sameer Reddy
| editing        = Madhur
| narrator       = Venkatesh
| studio         = Sri Venkateswara Creations The film released on 9 August 2018. The film was a huge commercial failure, with losses over 14Cr.

Plot 
Srinivas "Vasu" (Nithin) is a traditional guy who believes that marriage is the greatest festival in life and not just an event, but a beautiful moment. He lives away from his family. His cousin Padmavathi "Paddu" (Nandita Swetha) is in love with him and decides to propose him on the day he arrives. Vasu works as an architect in Chandigarh and meets Sridevi "Sri" (Raashi Khanna), who does several petty jobs for a living. They both eventually fall in love with each other. After the marriage of their friend Priya, they both realize that they are meant for each other, and Vasu proposes to Sri. Sri is a rich girl who lives a normal life as suggested by her father, R. K. (Prakash Raj), to understand people before taking part in his business. R. K. believes that marriage is an event in one's life and is not worth wasting a lot of time. Vasu informs R. K. about his love and asks for his permission. Both families meet and agree for their marriage, much to Paddu's disappointment. However, R. K. asks Vasu to sign the premarital agreement before he marries Sri, which he does. He then asks R. K. to promise to be present in everything that has to be done by bride's father. Vasu changes the views of R. K. about traditional marriages through his words and actions. On the wedding day, Sri's sister Kavya (Poonam Kaur) finds the agreement papers, while Paddu confesses her love to Vasu, who says that he always treated her as a friend, and even though he had not fell for Sri, he would never accept her love. On the altar, Vasu feels it wrong to keep the secret of the agreement and apologizes to his family until Kavya arrives with the agreement. Then, R. K. speaks how Vasu changed him and tears the papers. Sri forgives Vasu, and both happily get married. In the end credits, it is told that many people's lives changed due to their wedding, including Kavya who reconciles with her husband Siddhu, from whom she wanted to divorce.

Cast

 Nithin as Indhukuri Srinivasa Raju "Vasu"  
 Raashi Khanna as Padmaraju Sridevi "Sri"
 Nandita Swetha as Padmavati "Paddu", Vasu's cousin. 
 Prakash Raj as Padmaraju Radha Krishna (R.K), Sri's father
 Sithara as Lakshmi, Sri's mother
 Rajendra Prasad as Indhukuri Ramaraju, Vasu's father
 Aamani as Seeta, Vasu's mother
 Siva Krishna as Vasu's Grandfather (Cameo Appearance)
 Jayasudha as Vasu's grandmother  
 Naresh as Raju, Padmavati's father and Vasu's paternal Uncle
 Mamilla Shailaja Priya as Sarada, Padmavati's mother and Vasu's Paternal Aunt 
 Raja Chembolu as Kavya's Husband (End credits)
 Poonam Kaur as Kavya, Sri's elder sister
 Ajay as Ajay, wedding planner
 Prabhas Sreenu as Seenu
 Praveen as Praveen, Vasu's friend who doesn't believe in marriage system later marries Bujji.
 Vidyullekha Raman as Bujji, Vasu's friend later marries Praveen. 
 Satyam Rajesh as Rajesh, Vasu's friend
 Hari Teja as Shanti, Rajesh's wife
 RJ Hemath as Shekhar, Vasu's friend 
 Lahari Shari as Priya, Shekhar's fiance later wife and Vasu's friend.
 Josh Ravi as Prabhu, Vasu's friend
 Mahesh Achanta as Veerababu, servant
 Gemini Kiran as Vasu's Paternal Uncle.
 Meena as Vasu's paternal aunt
 Prabhu as Vasu's cousin
 Annapurna as Vasu's relative
 Giri Babu as Vasu's relative
 Rajitha as Vasu's relative
 Subhalekha Sudhakar as Minister
 Sivannarayana Naripeddi as Rao, Shekhar's father.
 Duvvasi Mohan as Minister's PA
 Deekshitulu as Priest
 Namala Murthy
 Appaji Ambarisha Darbha as Businessman

Release
The film was released on 9 August 2018. The film was dubbed and released in Hindi with the same name in 2019 and in Tamil as Kalyana Vaibhogam.

Soundtrack

The music is composed by Mickey J. Meyer and was released on ADITYA Music Company.

References 

2010s feminist films
2010s Telugu-language films
2018 films
2018 romantic drama films
Films about Indian weddings
Films about women in India
Films scored by Mickey J Meyer
Films set in Andhra Pradesh
Films set in Hyderabad, India
Films set in Konaseema
Films shot in Andhra Pradesh
Films shot in Chandigarh
Films shot in Hyderabad, India
Indian feminist films
Indian romantic drama films
Social realism in film
Sri Venkateswara Creations films